Latgales Laiks ("Latgalian Times") is a regional newspaper published in Latvia, mainly distributed in its easternmost region, Latgale. It was launched in 1992. Latgales Laiks focuses on the activities of Latgale inhabitants in different fields, devoting pages for coverage of sport events and interviews with athletes; important is reflection of Latgalian success in the world. There is a regional identity-building features, coming closer to the work of style of the national newspapers.

References 

Newspapers published in Latvia
1992 establishments in Latvia